Keron Cummings (born 28 May 1988), is an international soccer player from Trinidad and Tobago who plays professionally for Central FC as a midfielder.

On the soccer snob podcast, former T&T coach Stephen Hart said Keron Cummings is one of the best players he's ever coached. Should be playing abroad or internationally based on his ability.

International career

International goals
Scores and results list Trinidad and Tobago's goal tally first.

References

External links
Soca Warriors
No Molino, No Problem: Keron Becomes a Superstar

1988 births
Living people
Trinidad and Tobago footballers
Trinidad and Tobago international footballers
TT Pro League players
W Connection F.C. players
Central F.C. players
North East Stars F.C. players
2015 CONCACAF Gold Cup players
Association football midfielders